Joseph Susan (born September 18, 1955) is an American football coach and former player.  He is presently the Special Assistant to The Head Football Coach at Rutgers University. He was previously the head football coach for the Bucknell Bison of the Patriot League. Susan's second coaching stint at Bucknell (he was an assistant from 1981–1990) came on the heels of a nine-year tenure as the Rutgers Scarlet Knights offensive line and tight ends coach under Greg Schiano. He has been a head coach at one other school—Davidson College, where he led the Wildcats to the program's only perfect season in 2000. Susan stayed at Davidson for just that season.

Susan grew up in South River, New Jersey and played college football at the University of Delaware from 1973 to 1976; his senior season he was named the Newark Touchdown Club Offensive Lineman of the Year. The Fightin' Blue Hens won two Lambert Cups and were the NCAA Division II runners-up during his playing tenure.

Head coaching record

References

1955 births
Living people
American football offensive linemen
Bucknell Bison football coaches
Davidson Wildcats football coaches
Delaware Fightin' Blue Hens football coaches
Delaware Fightin' Blue Hens football players
Gettysburg Bullets football coaches
Princeton Tigers football coaches
Rutgers Scarlet Knights football coaches
People from South River, New Jersey